World Cup Golf: Hyatt Dorado Beach is a video game developed by ARC Developments and published by US Gold for the 32X.

Gameplay
World Cup Golf: Hyatt Dorado Beach is a game set in the golf course on the Dorado Beach of Puerto Rico.

Reception
Next Generation reviewed the game, rating it two stars out of five, and stated that "those people in search of a decent golf title should probably look for a game that's a little less demanding."

Reviews
PC Gamer (1995  April)
GamePro (Feb, 1995)
Electronic Gaming Monthly (Mar, 1995)
PC Games - Jan, 1995
Video Games & Computer Entertainment - Feb, 1995
PC Player - Jan, 1995

References

Arc Developments games
Golf video games
Sega 32X games
U.S. Gold games
Video games set in the Caribbean